The 1950 SANFL Grand Final was an Australian rules football competition.   beat  106 to 59.

References 

SANFL Grand Finals
SANFL Grand Final, 1950